The Jacksonville Dolphins men's basketball team represents Jacksonville University in the sport of basketball. The Dolphins compete in NCAA Division I's ASUN Conference (ASUN). Home games are played in the historic Swisher Gymnasium on the campus of Jacksonville University.

While the Jacksonville University's men's basketball team first took the court in 1948, the program did not join Division 1 until 1966. Early highlights included the program's first postseason appearance in the 1970 and were the national runners-up in 1970 led by future Hall of Fame and ABA/NBA Star Artis Gilmore. They have appeared in six NCAA tournaments, most recently in 1986.

History

Conference affiliations
 1948–49 to 1956–57 – NJCAA Independent
 1957–58 to 1965–66 – NAIA Independent
 1966–67 to 1975–76 – NCAA Division I Independent
 1976–77 to 1997–98 – Sun Belt Conference
 1998–99 to present – ASUN Conference

Notes

Postseason

NAIA results
The Dolphins have appeared in one NAIA tournament. Their overall record is 0–1.

NCAA tournament results
The Dolphins have appeared in the NCAA tournament five times and were the national runner-up in 1970. Their overall tournament record is 4–5.

NIT results
The Dolphins have appeared in six National Invitation Tournaments. Their overall record is 6–7.

CIT results
The Dolphins have appeared in two CollegeInsider.com Postseason Tournament. Their overall record is 1–2.

References

External links
 
 Website

 
1948 establishments in Florida
Basketball teams established in 1948